Shape of Things to Come is the fifth studio album by the American guitarist George Benson, released in 1968 and arranged by Don Sebesky.  It was his first album for A&M Records and his first album to be produced by Creed Taylor, who would remain his producer until 1976.

Background
After four years and three different labels, Benson signed with the A&M/CTI label in 1968. He was to be the replacement for their star Wes Montgomery, who had died earlier in the year. For his first album with the label, producer Taylor brought in all of the labels heavyweights, arranger Sebesky, engineer Rudy Van Gelder, and guest artists Herbie Hancock and Ron Carter. The album is mostly cover songs from artists as diverse as Aretha Franklin, The Monkees and Glenn Miller. It also contains a pair of original compositions and some reworkings of movie soundtracks.

Track listing
 "Footin' It" (George Benson, Don Sebesky) – 4:23
 "Face It Boy, It's Over" (Andy Badale, Frank Stanton) – 4:05
 "Shape of Things to Come" (Barry Mann, Cynthia Weil) – 5:15
 "Chattanooga Choo Choo" (Mack Gordon, Harry Warren) – 3:34
 "Don't Let Me Lose This Dream" (Aretha Franklin, Ted White) – 4:42
 "Shape of Things That Are and Were" (Benson) – 5:48
 "Last Train to Clarksville" (Tommy Boyce, Bobby Hart) – 5:32

Personnel
George Benson – guitar, vocals
Ron Carter – bass (tracks 2, 6-7)
Richard Davis – bass
Herbie Hancock – piano
Hank Jones – piano
Idris Muhammad (as Leo Morris) – drums
Dave Mankovitz – viola (tracks 1, 3-4)
George Marge – flute, cello (tracks 1, 3-4)
Romeo Penque – flute, cello (tracks 1, 3-4)
Alan Raph – trombone, sound effects, valve trombone, tuba (all tracks except 3)
George Ricci – cello (tracks 1, 3-4)
Stanley Webb – flute
Joe Shepley – trumpet, flugelhorn (all tracks except 3)
Wayne Andre – trombone, baritone saxophone (all tracks except 3)
Burt Collins – trumpet
Charles Covington – organ
Don Sebesky – arranger, conductor
Bernard Eichen – violin (tracks 1, 3-4)
Jack Jennings – percussion, vibraphone (tracks 1, 3-4)
Charles Libove – violin (tracks 1, 3-4)
Buddy Lucas – harmonica, tenor saxophone, amplified harmonica (all tracks except 3)
Johnny Pacheco – percussion, conga
Marvin Stamm – trumpet, flugelhorn, piccolo (all tracks except 3)

Technical
Creed Taylor – producer
Rudy Van Gelder – engineer
Sam Antupit – artwork
Pete Turner - photography

References

1968 albums
George Benson albums
Albums conducted by Don Sebesky
Albums arranged by Don Sebesky
Albums produced by Creed Taylor
A&M Records albums
Albums recorded at Van Gelder Studio